Judge Evans may refer to:

Beverly Daniel Evans Jr. (1865–1922), judge of the United States District Court for the Southern District of Georgia
Evan Alfred Evans (1876–1948), judge of the United States Court of Appeals for the Seventh Circuit
Orinda Dale Evans (born 1943), judge of the United States District Court for the Northern District of Georgia
Terence T. Evans (1940–2011) was a judge of the United States Court of Appeals for the Seventh Circuit
Walter Evans (American politician) (1842–1923), judge of the United States District Courts for the District of Kentucky and the Western District of Kentucky
Walter Howard Evans (1870–1959), judge of the United States Customs Court

See also
Justice Evans (disambiguation)